Chi Cao (b. March 22, 1978) is a British ballet dancer born in China.

Early life
Cao was born in Shanghai, the son of a dance teacher and a musician. When he was four years old, the family moved to Beijing.  He received training in classical dance at the Beijing Dance Academy, where his father was director.

Career
In 1993, he won a scholarship to train at the Royal Ballet School in London. Two years later, in 1995, he became a member of the Birmingham Royal Ballet. In 1998 he won the Gold Medal at the Varna International Ballet Competition. Together with his long-time dance partner , he represented the company, among other things, at the NATO gala in 2000 in Birmingham and the Golden Jubilee of Elizabeth II in 2002. In June 2018, he ended his long career with Birmingham Royal Ballet.

Film
Cao portrayed the Chinese ballet dancer Li Cunxin in the biographical film Mao's Last Dancer (2009). For this role he was nominated for Best Actor in the Inside Film Awards. Li Cunxin himself had recommended Chi Cao for this role because he knew his father.

Notes

External links
 

Birmingham Royal Ballet principal dancers
English male ballet dancers
Chinese male ballet dancers
Chinese emigrants to England
1978 births
Living people
People from Shanghai
Beijing Dance Academy alumni